Coleophora gedrosiae is a moth of the family Coleophoridae. It is found in Iran and Pakistan.

References

gedrosiae
Moths described in 1994
Moths of the Middle East